also simply referred to as  is a Japanese light novel series written by Dachima Inaka and illustrated by Pochi Iida. It was published by Fujimi Shobo under its Fujimi Fantasia Bunko imprint from January 2017 to April 2020 for a total of eleven volumes. The story focuses on teenager Masato Oosuki's relationship with his mother Mamako as they are both transported to a fantasy world within an online game.

A manga adaptation by Meicha was serialized in Kadokawa Shoten's digital manga magazine Young Ace Up from September 2017 to January 2021. Both the light novel and manga are licensed in North America by Yen Press. A RPG browser game based on the series was released in April 2017. An anime television series adaptation by J.C.Staff aired from July to September 2019, with an original video animation (OVA) episode released in March 2020, the same month a collaborative study book was launched. The anime is licensed in North America by Aniplex of America.

Synopsis

Premise 
Masato Oosuki is a teenager who is usually annoyed by his overly doting mother, Mamako, until both are teleported to a fantasy-themed world inside an online game. Masato tries his hardest to show his prowess inside the game, but constantly finds himself flustered by the fact that his mother possesses much higher stats, thus she can easily defeat all opponents with her twin swords, leaving little room for him to act. On their way, they befriend three girls who join their party. As they take quests inside the game, they later discover that it was originally designed to help strengthen the bonds between parents and their children.

Characters

Publication 

Do You Love Your Mom and Her Two-Hit Multi-Target Attacks? began as a light novel series written by Dachima Inaka, with illustrations provided by Pochi Iida. It started publication under Japanese publisher Fujimi Shobo's imprint Fujimi Fantasia Bunko, with the first volume released on January 20, 2017, while the last volume was released on April 17, 2020, making a total of 11 volumes published. During their panel at Sakura-Con on March 31, 2018, North American publisher Yen Press announced that they had licensed the series for an English version, which was translated by Andrew Cunningham, and released from November 27, 2018 to November 16, 2021.

Japanese voice actress Ai Kayano provided the voice of Mamako Oosuki, the titular mother, in a series of promotions for Do You Love Your Mom and Her Two-Hit Multi-Target Attacks?; Kayano would eventually reprise her role in the anime adaptation. As part of a promotional campaign for the series, Animate announced that they would give away a 16-page short story booklet to anyone who brought their mother to purchase one of the four winners of the 29th Fantasia Prizes.

Media

Manga 

A manga adaptation of Do You Love Your Mom and Her Two-Hit Multi-Target Attacks?, written and illustrated by Meicha, was serialized in Kadokawa Shoten's digital manga magazine Young Ace Up from September 26, 2017 to January 18, 2021. The series was also serialized on Kadokawa's Comic Walker platform. Kadokawa Shoten has compiled the chapters into five individual tankōbon volumes, published from August 25, 2018 to February 4, 2021. The manga is also licensed in North America by Yen Press, with the first volume published on September 3, 2019, while the fifth and final volume will be released on December 14, 2021.

Anime 

An anime television series adaptation was announced at the "Fantasia Bunko Dai Kanshasai 2018" event on October 21, 2018. The series was directed by Yoshiaki Iwasaki and written by Deko Akao, with animation by studio J.C.Staff. Yohei Yaegashi provided the series' character designs. Keiji Inai composed the music. It ran for 12 episodes from July 13 to September 28, 2019 on Tokyo MX and other channels. Spira Spica performed the series' opening theme song  while Ai Kayano performed the series' ending theme song  An additional OVA episode is bundled with the series' sixth Blu-ray volume, which was released on March 25, 2020. Aniplex of America has licensed the series.

Web radio 
A web radio show based on Do You Love Your Mom and Her Two-Hit Multi-Target Attacks? and hosted by Ai Kayano was broadcast every Wednesday and Friday starting on June 5, 2019.

Video game 
A RPG browser game adaptation of Do You Love Your Mom and Her Two-Hit Multi-Target Attacks?, developed by Atsumaru in collaboration with Urufu, was released on April 20, 2017, the same date the second volume in the series was published.

Other media 
A collaborative study book titled Let's Study English With Your Mom was launched in Japan on March 28, 2020. It is intended to help junior high level students with their English courses by featuring characters from the series explaining conversational English and grammar, as well as presenting complete sentences in English, within the book. Furthermore, customers that purchase the book are able to download bonus audio recordings by Kayano, in addition to receive a review quiz.

Reception

Popularity 
Prior to its print debut, Do You Love Your Mom and Her Two-Hit Multi-Target Attacks? won the 29th annual Fantasia Grand Prize, an award given to novels published under the Fujimi Fantasia Bunko label. Within the first nine days of its release, the first volume of the series had sold over 12,889 copies. As of May 2017, the first two volumes had sold a combined 100,000 copies, while the series had over 800,000 copies in circulation as of December 2019. In 2019, as reported by Crunchyroll, the anime website Charapedia held a fan poll between June 6 and 19 to identify the most anticipated anime series of the 2019 summer season; Do You Love Your Mom and Her Two-Hit Multi-Target Attacks? came in sixth place with 350 votes. The series has also inspired many memes on the internet.

Critical response 
Reviewing the first two episodes of the anime, Steve Jones of Anime News Network gave the series a 3 out of 5 star rating, saying it "emerges as an odd beast to pin down", while also commenting that the show's comedy "[has] definitely been hitting more often than the average isekai", with Jones admitting he had fun watching the episodes. In another review, Jones remarked how he enjoyed the show mostly because of its fan service. He also stated, "Do You Love Your Mom continues to function as a reasonably amusing self-aware isekai romp with plenty of motherly cheesecake to titillate its audience, but in no way do I trust it to say anything meaningful about motherhood without tripping over itself." In a third review, Jones highlighted how the anime addresses real-life issues related to abusive parent-child relationships, as, according to him, "It's good to try and address abusive parenting."

Bipin Adhikari of Comic Book Resources expressed his opinion that the show is "as hysterical as the name suggests". The review anime website Beneath the Tangles wrote, "Do You Love Your Mom and Her Two-Hit Multi-Target Attacks? offers a fun play on the usual light novel shenanigans by saddling the hapless male protagonist with his doting mother. This does offer some amusing comedy. However, the [series] does also offer a nice glimpse at a deeper them of motherhood and managing the bond between a mother and a teenage child who's starting to want some independence." 

Allen Moody of THEM Anime Reviews gave the anime a 2 out of 5 star rating, criticizing the series for its absurdly long title and dynamics between the characters.

See also 
 The Elder Sister-like One, a manga series written and illustrated by Pochi Iida

Notes 
Explanatory

Japanese

References

External links 
  
  
  
 
 

2017 Japanese novels
2019 anime television series debuts
Adventure anime and manga
Anime and manga based on light novels
Aniplex
Comedy anime and manga
Fujimi Fantasia Bunko
Isekai anime and manga
J.C.Staff
Kadokawa Dwango franchises
Kadokawa Shoten manga
Light novels
Seinen manga
Television shows based on light novels
Tokyo MX original programming
Yen Press titles